Marina Kaye (born 9 February 1998), born Marina Marie Madeleine Dalmas, is a French singer, songwriter and composer.

Most famous for the hit "Homeless", she has released the EP Homeless in 2014 and the album Fearless in 2015. On October 20, 2017, she released her second album, Explicit, which was certified gold.

Life and career

Childhood and France's Got Incredible Talent (1998–2011) 
Marina Marie Madeleine Dalmas was born in the 9th district of Marseille to a French father and a stay-at-home mother of Algerian-Kabyle origin, but grew up in the town of Allauch. She studied at Yves-Montand college until the age of 15, when she dropped out to relocate to London to work on her album in London.

She started posting videos of covers on her YouTube channel at the age of ten.

On 14 December 2011, at the age of 13, she won the sixth season of La France a un incroyable talent, the French version of the Got Talent series. She sang Rolling in the Deep and Set Fire to the Rain from Adele and Firework from Katy Perry.

After her victory, she decided to stop singing due to her classmates and some adults in her school. It was her meeting with Jan Erik Frogg that made her change her mind.

In 2012, she opened for the French musical comedy Adam et Ève: La Seconde Chance (mis en scène by Pascal Obispo). She also released a number of covers online and opened for Thirty Seconds to Mars at Palais des Festivals de Cannes and for Florent Pagny tour Vieillir Ensemble and in 2014 for five of Lindsey Stirling's concerts in France.

First album: Fearless (2015) 
She gained significant recognition with "Homeless" taken from her similarly titled EP Homeless. The single topped the SNEP French official singles chart.

On 18 May 2015, she released the album Fearless recorded in London and New York which includes the song "Freeze You Out" written by Sia and Chris Braide. The album went triple platinum in France.

Explicit (2017) 
In January, she played in Papounet, a French comedy directed by Dominique Farrugia.

On September 14, rapper and singer Soprano announced the tracklist for his album L'Everest which will be released the following month, with the song "Mon Everest" featuring Marina.

On October 20, she released Explicit, her second album shortly after releasing the official clip for "On My Own" and "Something".

Twisted (2020) 
On 18 September 2019, she released the song "Twisted", from the upcoming album with the same.

She released 3 more singles in 2020: "The Whole 9" on January 31, "Double Life" on September 2 and "7 Billion" on September 23.

On October 6, she announced via Twitter that the album would be released on November 6.

Personal life

She participates in the album Balavoine (s), released in January 2016 for the thirtieth anniversary of the death of Daniel Balavoine, using the title Only the very best. She performed at the South by Southwest festival in Texas in March 2016. She will also do a duet with rapper Soprano on the title Mon Everest. On January 7, 2017, she sang for the first time in French on television, taking over the title Vole by Céline Dion on TF1, in homage to Grégory Lemarchal (Grégory Lemarchal, 10 years after the story continues). A few months later, on October 20, 2017, she released a second album, Explicit. This becomes a gold disc.

She had a well-publicized feud with her father after he said on his own Facebook that his daughter was under immense psychological pressure and isolated from the realities of the world. He also blamed her for changing her name as an attempt to cut herself from her roots. She retorted that she was shocked and hurt by these declarations and said this was a continuation of what she described as a "traumatic childhood" in her youth, adding that her own father just wanted to destroy her career, to which Dalmas responded, "What father would like to destroy his children and their future?"

As of October 2020, Marina lives in Geneva, Switzerland.

Discography

Albums

Extended plays

Singles

As lead artist

As featured artist

Promotional singles

Other charting songs

Filmography
2017: Papounet

References

Notes

Sources

External links

Official website
Facebook
Twitter
Instagram
Youtube

1998 births
Living people
Musicians from Marseille
French people of Algerian descent
21st-century French singers
21st-century French women singers